Elisenda Vives Balmaña is an Andorran diplomat who has served as the country's Permanent Representative to the United Nations since November 2015. She is also Andorra's ambassador to the United States, Canada and Mexico, and former ambassador to Morocco and Italy.

Early life and education
Vives was born in Barcelona, Spain. Vives has a degree in philosophy and letters from the Autonomous University of Barcelona, a master's degrees in gender studies from the University of Barcelona, a master's degree in Eastern Asian studies and a postgraduate degree in comparative politics from the Open University of Catalonia, a postgraduate degree in Andorran law from the Universitat d'Andorra and a doctorate in history from the Autonomous University of Barcelona.

Career
Vives was a professor of geography and history before working for the principality's Ministry of Foreign Affairs from 1992 until 2001. She was ambassador of Andorra to Italy and Morocco from 2000 until 2001.

Vives was Head of Protocol and Administrative Affairs of the General Council from 2001 until 2015. She was President of the Andorran National Commission for UNESCO from 2012 until 2015.

Vives was appointed Andorra's Permanent Representative to the UN by Prime Minister Antoni Martí on 3 November 2015. On 2 March 2016 she was also appointed as Andorra's ambassador to the United States, Canada and Mexico.

On 30 November 2016, Vives and her Sri Lankan counterpart A. Rohan Perera signed a joint communique establishing diplomatic relations between the two countries.

Personal life
Vives is married and speaks four languages - Catalan, Spanish, French and English.

References

Living people
People from Barcelona
Andorran people of Catalan descent
Autonomous University of Barcelona alumni
University of Barcelona alumni
Andorran women ambassadors
Permanent Representatives of Andorra to the United Nations
Ambassadors of Andorra to Canada
Ambassadors of Andorra to Italy
Ambassadors of Andorra to Mexico
Ambassadors of Andorra to Morocco
Ambassadors of Andorra to the United States
Year of birth missing (living people)